Richard Pochinko (1946–1989) was a notable Canadian clown trainer who developed a new style of mask/clown performance training, known as the "Pochinko technique". Originally from Selkirk, Manitoba, he was based primarily in Toronto, Ontario and founded the city's Theater Resource Centre.

The "Pochinko technique" for which he is known combined both European and First Nations traditions of masked and clown performance. Notable figures who studied under Pochinko included Karen Hines, Cheryl Cashman, Nion, Tantoo Cardinal, Sue Morrison, Sara Tilley and the duo Mump and Smoot.

Pochinko was gay, and was the partner of Gabriel Manseau. He died in 1989 of AIDS-related causes.

See also 
Canadian clowning

References

External links
 Richard Pochinko

1946 births
1989 deaths
Canadian clowns
Canadian male stage actors
20th-century Canadian dramatists and playwrights
Canadian male dramatists and playwrights
AIDS-related deaths in Canada
Canadian gay actors
Canadian LGBT dramatists and playwrights
Canadian gay writers
L'École Internationale de Théâtre Jacques Lecoq alumni
20th-century Canadian male writers
20th-century Canadian LGBT people
Gay dramatists and playwrights